Joshua Cinnamo (born 18 February 1981 in San Diego, California), is a Paralympic athlete competing for the United States of America. Cinnamo competes in the F46 classification, as described by the International Paralympic Committee and World Para Athletics.

Cinnamo's most recent international competition was the 2019 World Para Athletics Championships, hosted by the People of Determination in Dubai, United Arab Emirates. There, he notably won the gold medal in the final of the Shot Put – F46 event with a world record throw of 16.80m. This was Cinnamo's first World Para Athletics medal after finishing 4th in the 2017 edition hosted in London, England.

Earlier in 2019, Cinnamo competed at the 2019 Parapan American Games in Lima, Peru. There he won a gold medal and set a new world record of 16.49m (previous mark 15.98m) in the Shot Put – F46 final; the first of two world record setting throws for the year.

Cinnamo has competed at the highest levels of adaptive athletics, including Crossfit, Strongman and powerlifting. As a member (and executive director) of Team Some Assembly Required, Cinnamo finished 2nd at the Arnold Sports Festival's World's Strongest Disabled Man.

References 

1981 births
Living people
Paralympic track and field athletes of the United States
American male shot putters
Medalists at the World Para Athletics Championships
Medalists at the 2019 Parapan American Games
Athletes (track and field) at the 2020 Summer Paralympics
Track and field athletes from San Diego
Luther Norse football players
Players of American football from San Diego
College men's track and field athletes in the United States